Battala is a highly populated residential and semi-industrial area in the central part of Serampore City in Hooghly district in West Bengal. The Battala region was an important center for printing books and Battala Prints.

Education 
 Akna Girl's High School
 Malina Lahiri Boy's Academy
 Ballavpur High School
 Adarsha Balika Vidyalaya
 Bharati Balika Vidyalaya

References 

Neighbourhoods in West Bengal
Serampore